The 2020–21 season will be Dumbarton Football Club's third in Scottish League One, the third tier of Scottish football, having finished sixth in the division in 2019–20. Dumbarton also competed in the Scottish League Cup and the Scottish Cup.

Story of the season

July 

After the premature end to the season due to the COVID-19 pandemic in the United Kingdom, preparations for the new campaign began in July with manager Jim Duffy signing a one-year contract extension. He was followed by defenders Morgyn Neill, Ryan McGeever and forward Stefan McCluskey in committing to the club for the new season. Young Player of the Year Rico Quitongo was next to sign a new deal, and he was joined by midfielder Ruaridh Langan. Striker Denny Johnstone then became the club's first new signing of the summer - joining after leaving Falkirk. Striker Robert Jones and captain Stuart Carswell were next to sign new deals. A day later PJ Crossan agreed a new deal, becoming the 10th player to sign up for the new campaign after six goals in his first season with the club. Later that week nine players left the club at the expiry of the contract, with player of the year Kyle Hutton, top scorer Isaac Layne, leading assister Joe McKee and number one goalkeeper Conor Brennan joined by Lewis Crawford, Jordan Pettigrew, Callum Wilson, Jai Quitongo and Ryan Tierney in leaving the club.

August 
Sam Wardrop was the club's second new signing of the window, joining from Dundee United after two successful loan spells. The Sons were drawn against Kilmarnock, Dunfermline Athletic, Clyde and Falkirk in the Scottish League Cup, which was scheduled the start the season in early October. On 25 August the club started pre-season training following a change in the Scottish Government guidelines implemented due to the COVID-19 pandemic in Scotland. Two days later Jim Paton became the club's new groundsman, replacing Alan Brown.

September 
On 1 September midfielder Nat Wedderburn became the club's third new season of the summer, joining on a one-year deal after leaving Airdrieonians. Goalkeeper Kevin Dąbrowski was next to join, signing on a season long loan from Hibernian. The Sons played their first game in over six months on 15 September, defeating local rivals Clydebank 4-0 in a closed doors friendly with trialist Jaime Wilson and new signing Denny Johnstone both scoring twice. Johnstone was again on the scoresheet in a friendly defeat to Greenock Morton before a 3-2 victory against Albion Rovers with Robert Jones scoring twice and Ross Forbes finding the net from long range. The Sons then drew 1-1 with BSC Glasgow with a trialist on the scoresheet. Defender Chris Hamilton became the club's fifth new signing of the summer, joining on-loan from Heart of Midlothian.

October 
On 2 October long-serving goalkeeper coach Jamie Ewings left the club after nine seasons with the club as a player and a coach. He was replaced by former Ayr United and Annan Athletic goalkeeper coach Robert Glen in the role. The same day C&G Systems were announced as the club's new shirt sponsors for the upcoming season. Goalkeeper Chris Smith became the club's sixth new signing of the summer. Returning to the club on a permanent deal after a loan spell from East Kilbride in 2018–19. The Sons season started with a 1-0 Scottish League Cup defeat to Dunfermline Athletic, before a 3-2 defeat to Clyde with Chris Hamilton scoring his first goal for the club - and being sent off. Forward Jaime Wilson became the club's seventh new signing of the summer on 12 October, joining from National Premier Leagues Victoria 2 side Northcote City. Donald Morrison became the club's next new addition, joining from Inverness Caledonian Thistle on 16 October. The Sons' league season began with a 0-0 draw against Forfar Athletic, with winger Matthew Reilly playing as a trialist. He went on to sign permanently for the club on 23 October before the club's first home league game against Clyde was called off due to a waterlogged pitch. The following week Adam Frizzell became the club's 10th new addition of the summer on 30 October, joining on a permanent basis after a successful loan spell. The same day it was announced that the Sons next home match, against Airdrieonians, would be switched to the Excelsior Stadium due to forecast poor weather. Despite the change of venue Sons still recorded their first victory of the season in the match, with Jaime Wilson and a Leon McCann own goal securing a 2-0 win.

November 
The Sons continued their good start to the season with a 1-0 victory against Clyde on 3 November. Adam Frizzell got the only goal on his second debut for the club. The same day goalkeeper Chris Calder joined the club on an emergency loan from West of Scotland Football League side St Roch's. The unbeaten start to the season ended on 7 November against East Fife in a game where Dumbarton had three goals disallowed. Three days later Sons lost again, 4-0 at home to Falkirk, in the Scottish League Cup - in a tie where they were only able to name one outfield substitute. Three days later the Sons strengthened their squad again, with the addition of defender Daniel Church from Celtic. Church made his debut the next day, as the Sons dismal Scottish League Cup form continued with a 2-0 defeat to Kilmarnock. Back on league duty, Dumbarton recorded a fourth consecutive defeat - losing 1-0 to Peterhead. A miserable month ended with Sons suffering a fifth straight defeat, 3-0 at home to Falkirk on 24 November.

December 
The Sons barren run in front of goal stretched into December, as the month opened with a 0-0 draw against Partick Thistle - with Kevin Dąbrowski saving a first-half Brian Graham penalty. In that game 16-year-old goalkeeper Michael Carr was named on the bench, becoming the youngest ever play to be involved in a Sons matchday squad. A week later Nat Wedderburn then got the only goal as Sons ended their winless streak with a 1-0 home victory against Cove Rangers. They failed to build on that however, suffering a heavy defeat to Montrose the following week. The club's final game of 2020 against East Fife on Boxing Day was then called off because of a waterlogged pitch.

January 
Another postponement followed, as the Sons' tie with Airdrieonians on 2 January was called off because of a frozen pitch. The decision meant that five of the club's first six home matches of the league season had been rearranged - with four failing pitch inspections and one moved due to Falkirk advancing in the Scottish League Cup. Days later goalkeeper Kevin Dąbrowski, who had been a key figure, was recalled by Hibernian after an injury to Ofir Marciano. He was followed out by fellow loanee Chris Hamilton who was recalled by Heart of Midlothian and loaned to Stirling Albion. On January 9 goalkeeper Joshua Bradley-Hurst became the club's first signing of the winter window, joining from Birmingham City however the same day the Sons Scottish Cup tie with Highland Football League side Huntly became the club's sixth game of the season to be called off. The following day defender Daniel Church and midfielder Adam Frizzell extended their deals until the end of the season, whilst defender Donald Morrison left the club at the end of his short-term deal. On January 11 the Sons season was put on hold, with a three week suspension of lower league football introduced due to the COVID-19 pandemic in Scotland. The season postponement was then extended further - until at least mid-February.

February 
The suspension of lower league football was extended into March in early February - despite clubs offering to test their players weekly. This led to calls from Stefan McCluskey for the Scottish Government to rethink their decision whilst a PFA Scotland survey showed that players were overwhelmingly in favour of a return to the pitch.

March 
On March 2 First Minister Nicola Sturgeon gave clubs the green-light to return to action with the resumption of the league season scheduled for Saturday March 20. The club's outstanding 2020–21 Scottish Cup tie with Huntly was also rescheduled - for March 23. After returning to training on March 6, Jim Duffy started to reshape his squad - with winger Matthew Reilly and striker Denny Johnstone both departing. Midfielder Tomas Brindley became the club's first arrival of the month, joining on loan from Kilmarnock on March 11. On March 13 the Sons finally returned to the pitch after almost three months, losing 2-1 in a friendly to Scottish League Two side Stranraer. Goalkeeper Sam Ramsbottom was the club's third new face of the winter window, joining after Joshua Bradley-Hurst suffered an injury. He was followed in arriving before the first game of 2021 by defender Nicholas McAllister, who joined on loan from St Mirren. The Sons season resumed with defeat to Forfar Athletic on March 20 - courtesy of an unfortunate Ryan McGeever own goal. Two days later winger Stefan McCluskey who was ruled out for the season with a shoulder injury left the club whilst Conner Duthie - who had featured as a trialist again Forfar - signed a deal until the end of the season. Winger Rabin Omar and striker James Wallace were next to arrive, joining on-loan from Greenock Morton. Following a 1-0 defeat to Peterhead striker Isaac Layne rejoined the club on-loan from the Blue Toon. He made his debut as a late substitute on March 30, in a 1-1 draw with Falkirk where Rabin Omar scored his first goal for the Sons.

April 
April began with another 1-0 home loss, this time against Airdrieonians. Another 1-0 home loss - the Sons' fourth in five games - followed, this time to Scottish Premiership side Aberdeen in the Scottish Cup. Goalkeeper Chris Smith left the club on April 6 due to work commitments with Jamie Barclay signed on an emergency loan deal from Kilwinning Rangers as his replacement. On April 8 the Sons finally secured their first league win of 2020, with Ryan McGeever and Adam Frizzell on target in a 2-1 victory against East Fife. A controversial defeat to Cove Rangers followed, before a second victory of the year against Clyde thanks to a Nat Wedderburn header. That victory was followed by back-to-back defeats to Partick Thistle and East Fife. The run was halted on April 27, with a 1-0 success against Forfar Athletic courtesy of Conner Duthie's late strike. The month ended with private equity firm Cognitive Capital Ltd buying out Brabco 736, to become the club's majority shareholder.

May 
May began with a 2-0 defeat to Clyde that left the Sons a point adrift of safety with just one game remaining. The regular season ended on May 4, with a dramatic 3-2 victory against Peterhead thanks to an injury time header from Jaime Wilson. Two days later however Clyde defeated East Fife to send the Sons into the playoffs, with the semi-final seeing Jim Duffy's side defeat Stranraer over two legs thanks to Jaime Wilson's goal. The Sons secured their place in Scottish League One with a 3-2 final victory against Edinburgh City. Goals from Ryan McGeever, Tomas Brindley and Morgyn Neill saw Dumbarton win the first-leg 3-1, before losing the second 1-0 with Ouzy See getting the only goal. The home leg was played in front of a sell-out crowd of 398 - the first time in 15 months fans had been able to attend a game due to the COVID-19 pandemic in Scotland.

First team transfers 
From end of 2019–20 season, to last match of season 2020–21

In

Out

Fixtures and results

Friendlies

Scottish League One

Scottish League One Playoffs

Scottish Cup

Scottish League Cup

Matches

Player statistics

All competitions

Captains

League table

References 

Dumbarton
Dumbarton